And The Winner Is Love is a 2020 Chinese television series based on the novel of the same name by Junzi Yize. It stars Luo Yunxi and Chen Yuqi as leads. It is available on iQIYI with multi-languages subtitles starting May 28, 2020.

Synopsis 
Chong Xuezhi, young mistress of Chonghuo Palace, leaves her home for the first time to experience the pugilist world and runs into Shangguan Tou, master of the Yueshang Valley. While outside, Chong Xuezhi finds out she has been banished from the palace after their treasured martial arts manual “Nine Techniques of the Lotus God” is stolen, and decides to track down the thief with the help of Shangguan Tou. After going through various trials and tribulations together, the traveling companions profess their love for each other and get married. News spreads that the perpetrator has already mastered the martial arts technique, and is wreaking havoc through jianghu. The main couple discovers that the culprit is, in fact, Xia Qing Mei, of the Sword Sect, and a bloody battle ensues.

Cast

Main

Production and Reception
The series began filming in April 2019.

The series reunites Luo Yunxi, Chen Yuqi and Zou Tingwei from the 2017 drama Ashes of Love.

The series was commercially successful as the most-watched web drama between April and June.

References

External links
 Website

Chinese wuxia television series
Television shows based on Chinese novels
Television series by Perfect World Pictures
2020 Chinese television series debuts